KAXA (103.7 FM) is a radio station licensed to Mountain Home, Texas. The station broadcasts an adult hits format and is owned by Justin McClure, through licensee Jam Broadcasting, LLC. KAXA 103.7 FM serves the Kerrville, Texas area.

On January 8, 2023 KAXA changed their format from country (which moved to KZAH 99.1 FM Harper) to adult hits, branded as "103.7 Mike FM".

Previous logo

References

External links

AXA
Adult hits radio stations in the United States
Radio stations established in 2012
2012 establishments in Texas